Gessius Florus was the 7th Roman procurator of Judea from 64 until 66.

Biography
Born in Clazomenae, Florus was appointed to replace Lucceius Albinus as procurator by the Emperor Nero due to his wife Cleopatra's friendship with Nero's wife Poppaea. He was noted for his antagonism toward the Judean and Jewish population, and is credited by Josephus as being the primary cause of the First Jewish–Roman War.

Upon taking office in Caesarea, Florus began favoring local Greek population of the city over the Jewish population. The local Greek population noticed Florus' policies and took advantage of the circumstances. One notable instance of provocation occurred while the Jews were worshiping at their local synagogue and a Hellenist sacrificed several birds on top of a chamber pot at the entrance of the synagogue, an act that rendered the building ritually unclean. In response to this action, the Jews sent a group of men to petition Florus for redress. Despite accepting a payment of eight talents to hear the case, Florus refused to listen to the complaints and instead had the petitioners imprisoned.

Florus further angered the Jewish population of his province by having seventeen talents removed from the treasury of the Temple in Jerusalem, claiming the money was for the Emperor. In response to this action, the city fell into unrest and some of the Jewish population began to openly mock Florus by passing a basket around to collect money as if Florus were poor. Florus reacted to the unrest by sending soldiers into Jerusalem the next day to raid the city and arrest a number of the city leaders. The arrested individuals were whipped and crucified despite many of them being Roman citizens.

After the outbreak of the First Jewish–Roman War, Florus was replaced as procurator by Marcus Antonius Julianus.

See also
 Prefects, Procurators, and Legates of Roman Judaea

Notes

References
 
 

Roman governors of Judaea
1st-century Romans
1st-century Roman governors of Judaea
Poppaea Sabina
Gessii